Mr. 420 is a 2012 Indian Kannada-language romantic comedy film starring Ganesh and Pranitha Subhash. This film was directed by Pradeep Raj and produced by Sandesh Nagaraj under Sandesh films banner. V. Harikrishna is the music composer and R. Giri is the cinematographer. The film made its theatrical release on 19 October 2012.

Plot 
Krishna is a village boy whose grandmother dies and leaves for Bangalore with his uncle Ranganna to eke out a living. But Ranganna’s family engages in Pickpocketing and theft. Krishna feels disgusted and leaves for his village but circumstances force him to accept the situation. Krishna falls in love with Rukmini, who leaves his activities when Rukku learns of this. Krishna and Ranganna seek jobs at an electronic showroom, but to no avail.

They work as Bagger in bus station and finds a suitcase and are caught by the police led by Inspector Sadhu and find a severed head in the suitcase, which the duo and Sadhu initially thought was a bag of money. They find that the severed head is actually the famous underworld gangster Karadi Seena. Circumstances force Krishna and Ranganna to tell that they killed Seena to Seena's rival gang and they treat them with respect and lead a luxurious life.

The twist in the tail arises when the due learns that Seena is Rukmini's brother and decide to prove their innocence. Rukmini misunderstands Krishna to be Seena's killer and leaves him, Krishna follows Rukmini to prove his innocence. Meanwhile, The gang finds out that their gang member Paagal actually killed Seena and chases Ranganna, who escapes and proves Krishna's innocence. They are chased by the gang along with Sadhu and officers.

A hilarious climax ensues where Sadhu accidentally shoots at sting bees and the bees attack them. Krishna-Ranganna and Rukmini jump from a terrace to a swimming pool and are saved. Thus, Krishna-Ranganna are proved innocent and leave for their village and become farmers and start farming at their grandmother's land

Cast
 Ganesh as Krishna
 Pranitha Subhash as Rukmini
 Rangayana Raghu as Ranganna
 Sadhu Kokila
 Chikkanna

Reception

Critical response 

A critic from The Times of India scored the film at 2.5 out of 5 stars and says "While Ganesh has done justice to the role, Rangayana Raghu impresses only in some sequences. Pranitha is okay. Music by V Harikrishna fails to register". A critic from News18 India wrote "V Harikrishna is also monotonous in his tunes. Nothing is catchy from his five songs. R Giri cinematography is OK but nothing appealing in shots. Editing also deserved to be better. The main trump card that was supposed to be dialogues for Ganesh is also substandard". Shruti I L from Deccan Herald wrote "As for Ganesh, his fans may also be left asking for more.  It would do the actor good to be more choosy about his roles and not stereotype himself. Our final verdict: Don’t let this Mr 420  burn a hole in your pocket, watch out!". A Sharadhaa The New Indian Express wrote " V Harikrishna's music with Kaviraj, Nagendra Prasad and Yograj Bhat's lyrics does not give out the best tracks for the film and there is nothing really to boast about R Giri's cinematography either. Verdict: 'Mr 420' did not give a festive buzz". Srikanth Srinivasa from Rediff.com scored the film at 2.5 out of 5 stars and says "Sadhu Kokila as an inspector gets the most laughs. Rangayana Raghu acts well in the first half but tends to overact in the second half. Ganesh has performed well but is overshadowed by the others. Pranitha is good. Director Pradeep Raj appears as a villain in the movie. The music is just average, as is the camerawork". B S Srivani from Deccan Herald wrote "And what goes on as comedy is too loud and garbled to be made much sense of. Stories like this one are predictable at best. But Mr 420 teaches a devoted movie buff not to have any expectation at all. Pity the waste of money here". A critic from Bangalore Mirror wrote  "At one point of the film when an item song is imminent Raghu says, “I need a Bombay girl. Those girls are white.” This is the kind of instincts that the film caters to. This is the stuff that B-grade comedies with B-grade heroes are made of. Not at all worthy of Ganesh".

Soundtrack

V. Harikrishna composed 5 songs to the lyrics of Jayanth Kaikini.

References

External links
 

2012 films
2010s Kannada-language films
Films directed by Pradeep Raj